Île Jésus (Jesus Island) is a river island in southwestern Quebec, separated from the mainland to the north by the Rivière des Mille Îles, and from the Island of Montreal to the south by the Rivière des Prairies. It is the second-largest island in the Hochelaga Archipelago (after the Island of Montreal), and the fourth most populous island in Canada, with more than 420,000 residents as of 2016.

Île Jésus is the major component of the City of Laval, along with the Îles Laval and several other islands. The island still has a considerable rural portion, with most of the urban area in the central region and along the south and west river banks.

Former cities 

Auteuil
Chomedey
Duvernay
Fabreville
Îles Laval
Laval-Ouest
Laval-des-Rapides
Laval-sur-le-Lac
Pont-Viau
Saint-François
Saint-Vincent-de-Paul
Sainte-Dorothée
Sainte-Rose
Vimont

See also 
 Olivier Charbonneau
 List of islands of Quebec

External links
 City of Laval official website 
 www.INFOLaval.com Online Commercial and Industrial directory of the island of Laval. (French - English)

Jesus
Landforms of Laval, Quebec
Canada geography articles needing translation from French Wikipedia